Sealed Lips is a 1942 American film noir crime film directed by George Waggner and starring William Gargan, June Clyde and John Litel.

Plot summary

Main cast
 William Gargan as Lee Davis  
 June Clyde as Lois Grant  
 John Litel as Fred M. Morton / Mike Rofano  
 Anne Nagel as Mary Morton - Fred's Wife  
 Mary Gordon as Mrs. Ann Morton, Fred's mother
 Ralf Harolde as Lips Haggarty 
 Joseph Crehan as Chief Charles R. Dugan  
 Addison Richards as Chief Gary Benson  
 Russell Hicks as Dr. Charles Evans  
 Edwin Stanley as Warden  
 Charles Lane as Attorney Emanuel 'Manny' T. Dixon  
 William Gould as Dist. Atty. Slater  
 Walter Sande as Investigator Gene Blake

References

Bibliography
 Gates, Phillipa. Detecting Women: Gender and the Hollywood Detective Film. SUNY Press, 2011.

External links
 

1942 films
1942 crime films
American crime films
Films directed by George Waggner
Universal Pictures films
American black-and-white films
1940s English-language films
1940s American films